Sir Roger John Carrick  (born 13 October 1937) is a former British diplomat and an author and business adviser.

Career
Carrick was educated at Isleworth Grammar School (now Isleworth and Syon School). He passed the examination for Her Majesty's Foreign Service, later Diplomatic Service in 1956, but spent only 11 days there before departing for National Service in the Royal Navy 1956–58, during which he learned Russian at the Joint Services School for Linguists. He then returned to the Foreign Office (later the Foreign and Commonwealth Office, FCO).  He served in London, and was sent to the School of Slavonic and East European Studies at London University in 1961 to do a degree course in Bulgarian language and literature in one year. He served at Sofia, Paris and Singapore, was a visiting fellow at the Institute of International Studies at the University of California, Berkeley, 1977–78, and a Political Counsellor at the Washington Embassy 1978–82. After further service at the FCO, he was made Consul-General at Chicago 1985–88, Assistant Under-Secretary (Economic) at the FCO 1988–90, Ambassador to Indonesia 1990–94 and High Commissioner to Australia 1994–97.

After a farewell tour of Australia in the High Commission's champagne oyster-coloured Rolls-Royce Silver Spur IV. Carrick retired from the Diplomatic Service in 1997 at the then mandatory age of 60. He has been chairman of various companies including Strategy International and Lime Finance.

Carrick was appointed LVO in 1972 and CMG in the New Year Honours of 1983, and knighted KCMG in the Queen's Birthday Honours of 1995.

Publications
East-West technology transfer in perspective, Institute of International Studies, University of California, Berkeley, 1978. 
RolleroundOz: reflections on a journey around Australia, Allen & Unwin, 1998. 
Admiral Arthur Phillip RN, founder & first governor of Australia: a British view, Menzies Centre for Australian Studies, London, 2011
Diplomatic Anecdotage: Around the World in 40 Years,  Elliott & Thompson, London, 2012. 
Various articles in learned and other journals, chapters in books, including Symphony for Australia (2007), The Foreign Office, Commerce and British Foreign Policy in the Twentieth Century, Palgrave Macmillan 2017

References

External links
CARRICK, Sir Roger (John), Who's Who 2013, A & C Black, 2013; online edn, Oxford University Press, Dec 2012
Interview with Sir Roger Carrick, British Diplomatic Oral History Programme, Churchill College, Cambridge, 8 January 2004

1937 births
Living people
Alumni of the UCL School of Slavonic and East European Studies
Ambassadors of the United Kingdom to Indonesia
High Commissioners of the United Kingdom to Australia
British non-fiction writers
Knights Commander of the Order of St Michael and St George
Lieutenants of the Royal Victorian Order
British male writers
Male non-fiction writers